Grevillea leucoclada is a species of flowering plant in the family Proteaceae and is endemic to a small area in the west of Western Australia. It is a shrub with divided leaves, the lobes further divided, the end lobes linear or tapered, and cone-shaped clusters of white to cream-coloured flowers.

Description

This grevillea regenerates from seed and is similar to G. intricata, which does not have glaucous branchlets.

Taxonomy
Grevillea leucoclada was first formally described in 1986 by Donald McGillivray in his book, New Names in Grevillea (Proteaceae) from specimens he collected with Alex George between the North West Coastal Highway and Kalbarri in 1976. The specific epithet, (leucoclada), derives from two Greek words: leucos (white) and clados (shoot/sprout), combined to give leucocladus, - a, -um, describing the plant as having white shoots.

Distribution and habitat
Grevillea leucoclada grows in shrubland, often in rocky places, in areas around the lower reaches of the Murchison River in the Geraldton Sandplains bioregion in the west of Western Australia.

Conservation status
Grevillea leucoclada is listed as "Priority Three" by the Government of Western Australia Department of Biodiversity, Conservation and Attractions, meaning that it is poorly known and known from only a few locations but is not under imminent threat.

See also
 List of Grevillea species

References

leucoclada
Proteales of Australia
Flora of Western Australia
Taxa named by Donald McGillivray
Plants described in 1986